The Vox Custom 24 was one of a group of guitars produced in Japan by the Matsumoku company between 1980–85, which included the Custom and Standard 24 and Custom and Standard 25 guitars.  Custom and Standard bass guitars were also included in the range. Matsumoku had already produced guitars for Aria and other brands such as Westbury. These were recognised as leaders in performance, innovation and quality. The electronics in these guitars were designed by Adrian Legg. The guitars are passive but the complex switching allows for a wide variety of sounds, making them extremely versatile instruments.

The Custom 24 is a 24.75" (Les Paul comparable scale) scale guitar with a "through neck" construction, featuring a thin C shaped neck profile and 24 vintage style low frets.  The neck and body of the guitar are fashioned from heavy rock maple, and the bound fretboard is made from striped ebony.  The guitar also features a stop tailpiece with an adjustable bridge that differs only  slightly from a traditional Tune-O-Matic type found commonly on the Gibson Les Paul.

The Vox Custom 24 is also equipped with stock DiMarzio X2N humbuckers, which have among the highest output of any commercially available pickup.  Switching on the guitar body allows the pickups to be shifted between series/parallel/split wiring, and a phase switch can be used to place the two pickup outputs out of sonic phase with one another, creating a very wide range of outputs and possible tones.

Custom 24 can also refer to a guitar model made by Paul Reed Smith.

References

Guitars